= Khemalapur =

- Village
- Country: India
- State: Karnataka
- District: Belgaum

Area
  - Total: 3,000 km^{2} (1,200 sq mi)
  - Rank: 1

Population (2001)
  - Total: 5,111
  - Density: 1.7/km^{2} (4.4/sq mi)

Languages
  - Official: Kannada
- Time zone: UTC+5:30 (IST)
- Postal code: 591311
- Vehicle registration: KA23

Khemalapur is a village in Belgaum district in Karnataka, India.
